Frank Greenhoff (3 March 1924 – August 1999) was an English professional footballer who played as a winger. Born in Barnsley, he played for his hometown club, Barnsley Football Club before joining Bradford City in 1948. He made 81 appearances in the English Football League for Bradford City, before moving to Worksop Town in July 1952.

References

Bibliography

1924 births
1999 deaths
Footballers from Barnsley
English footballers
Manchester City F.C. players
Barnsley F.C. players
Bradford City A.F.C. players
Worksop Town F.C. players
English Football League players
Association football wingers